Wuttichai Asusheewa (born September 14, 1983) is a Thai professional footballer who plays as a striker.

External links
 Profile at Goal

1983 births
Living people
Wuttichai Asusheewa
Wuttichai Asusheewa
Association football forwards
Wuttichai Asusheewa
Wuttichai Asusheewa
Wuttichai Asusheewa
Wuttichai Asusheewa
Wuttichai Asusheewa
Wuttichai Asusheewa
Wuttichai Asusheewa